FSTA may refer to:

Future Strategic Tanker Aircraft
Fantasy Sports Trade Association
Food Science and Technology Abstracts